Jong may refer to:

Surname
Chung (Korean surname), spelled Jong in North Korea
Zhong (surname), spelled Jong in the Gwoyeu Romatzyh system
Common Dutch surname "de Jong"; see
 De Jong
 De Jonge
 De Jongh
Erica Jong (born 1942), American author

Given name
Jong Uichico, Filipino professional basketball head coach 
Kim Jong (table tennis) (born 1989), North Korean table tennis player

Locations
 Jong, Iran, a village in Razavi Khorasan Province, Iran
 Jong, Norway, a district in the municipality of Bærum, Norway
 Jong River, a river in Sierra Leone
 Pulau Jong, Singapore island

Other
 Mala Mala Jong, a fictional character from the animated series Xiaolin Showdown
 Muk Yan Jong, a martial arts dummy
Javanese jong, a type of ancient sailing ship
 Dutch for "young", e.g.
 Jong Ajax
 Jong Vlaanderen
 Jong Zuid Afrika